Mouila is the capital of the Ngounié region of Gabon.  It lies on the Ngounié River and the N1 road and has a population of about 20,000 people. Its main sight is Lac Bleu, a lake known for its bright blue water.

Mouila is very spread out and has several markets and commercial centers.  A taxi service runs in Mouila. Taxis are green and white and cost 200–500 Central African CFA francs depending on the distance traveled.

Mouila is home to a huge range of Gabonese ethnic groups and is a major hub of commerce and travel.  It is served by Mouila Airport. From Mouila, bush taxis may be obtained traveling to Ndende, Tchibanga, Lambaréné, Libreville and Lebamba.

Climate 
Mouila has a tropical savanna climate (Köppen climate classification Aw).

Notable people
 François Bozizé, a former president of the Central African Republic, is from Mouila.
 Pierre Mamboundou, politician
 André Raponda Walker, the anthropologist and priest worked near here at a place called Sainte-Martin.

References

Populated places in Ngounié Province